United We Stand is the fifth studio album by the American band Brad. It was released on April 24, 2012. To promote the album the band toured, including their first ever shows in the United Kingdom. It was the final studio album to feature frontman Shawn Smith, who died in April 2019.

Track listing

Personnel
Brad
Shawn Smith – vocals, piano, organ
Stone Gossard – guitars
Keith Lowe – bass guitar
Regan Hagar – drums

References

Brad (band) albums
2012 albums